Ceriporiopsis pseudoplacenta is a species of poroid crust fungus in the family Polyporaceae. It was described as a new species by mycologists Josef Vlasák and Leif Ryvarden in 2012. The type specimen was collected in Bogachiel State Park, Washington, where it was found growing on a coniferous log. It is named for its superficial similarity to Postia placenta.

References

Fungi described in 2012
Fungi of the United States
Phanerochaetaceae
Taxa named by Leif Ryvarden
Fungi without expected TNC conservation status